The Peugeot Type 58 is an early motor car produced by the French auto-maker Peugeot at their Audincourt plant in 1904. Despite being in production for only a year, 121 were produced.

The Type 58 replaced the company's successful Type 56 model, and carried over most of the mechanical components from its predecessor, but the Type 58 was 15 cm (6 inches) longer than the Type 56.

The Type 58 was propelled using a single cylinder 833 cc four stroke engine, mounted ahead of the driver.

The car sat on a  wheelbase. The open carriage Tonneau format body offered space for four.

Sources and further reading 
 Wolfgang Schmarbeck: Alle Peugeot Automobile 1890-1990. Motorbuch-Verlag. Stuttgart 1990. 

Type 58
Cars introduced in 1904
1900s cars
Veteran vehicles